Beaumes-de-Venise is a commune in the Vaucluse department in the Provence-Alpes-Côte d'Azur region in southeastern France.

Name
The word "beaumes" comes from the Provençal word bauma meaning "cave" or "grotto". The surrounding hills have many of these caves that were inhabited during the Iron Age.

Wine
The village gives its name to a sweet wine appellation, Muscat de Beaumes-de-Venise. It also gives its name to a drier red wine, formerly Côtes du Rhone Villages Beaumes-de-Venise, now Beaumes de Venise AOC.

See also
 Dentelles de Montmirail
Communes of the Vaucluse department

References

Communes of Vaucluse